Leonīds Janis Vedējs (October 12, 1908 – February 4, 1995) was a Latvian ice hockey defenceman. He played with the Latvia men's national ice hockey team at the 1936 Winter Olympics held in Garmisch-Partenkirchen, Germany. He was the flag bearer of the Latvian delegation at the opening ceremony as well as the captain of the hockey team.

References

External links

1908 births
1995 deaths
Sportspeople from Daugavpils
People from Dvinsky Uyezd
Ice hockey players at the 1936 Winter Olympics
Latvian ice hockey defencemen
Olympic ice hockey players of Latvia
Latvian Waffen-SS personnel
Latvian World War II refugees
Latvian emigrants to the United States
Recipients of the Iron Cross (1939), 1st class
Recipients of the Iron Cross (1939), 2nd class